Sport Lisboa e Benfica, commonly known as Benfica, is a Portuguese sports club based in Lisbon. Ever since its foundation on 28 February 1904 as Sport Lisboa (later merged with Grupo Sport Benfica), it has had a total of 34 presidents. The first president was José Rosa Rodrigues and the current one is Rui Costa, who replaced the longest-serving Benfica president, Luís Filipe Vieira. The shortest tenure belongs to António Nunes de Almeida Guimarães.

To elect a president, the paying members of Benfica, along with Benfica houses, filiations, and delegations, vote in the club's elections, held every four years since 2012. In 2003 the club switched to electronic voting, and since 2010 only effective members with 25 years of continuous membership as an adult can run for president of Benfica. Therefore, they must be at least 43 years old to do so.

The following chronological list comprises all those who have held the position of president of Benfica since its inception. Each president's entry includes dates and duration of his tenure, as well as the club's men's football honours won under his management. Interim presidents are marked in italics.

List of presidents

Notes

References

Presidents
 
Pr